The South Street Historic District is a historic district on South Street from Main Street to Warren Avenue in Brockton, Massachusetts.  South Street was a fashionable residential address from about 1850 to 1915, and includes a cross-section of residential architectural styles, with the Colonial Revival predominating.  The district includes two church buildings: the South Congregational Church, built in 1854 and demolished in the early 1990s to make way for a Walgreens pharmacy, and the South Street Methodist Church, an 1880 building which has been converted to residential use.

The district was added to the National Register of Historic Places in 1983.

See also
National Register of Historic Places listings in Plymouth County, Massachusetts

References

Historic districts in Plymouth County, Massachusetts
Buildings and structures in Brockton, Massachusetts
National Register of Historic Places in Plymouth County, Massachusetts
Historic districts on the National Register of Historic Places in Massachusetts